Saponarin is a flavone glucoside. It is found in Saponaria officinalis and in Strongylodon macrobotrys where it imparts the characteristic jade color to the flower. This coloration has been shown to be an example of copigmentation, a result of the presence of malvin (an anthocyanin) and saponarin in the ratio 1:9. Under the alkaline conditions (pH 7.9) found in the sap of the epidermal cells, this combination produced a blue-green pigmentation; the pH of the colorless inner floral tissue was found to be lower, at pH 5.6. Experiments showed that saponarin produced a strong yellow colouring in slightly alkaline conditions, resulting in the greenish tone of the flower. It is also found in passion flowers (Passiflora sp.).

References 

Flavone glucosides
C-glycoside natural phenols